KFGD-LP is a low power radio station broadcasting out of Fresno, California.

History
KFGD-LP began broadcasting on December 14, 2015.

References

External links
 

Mass media in Fresno, California
2016 establishments in California
FGD-LP
FGD-LP
Radio stations established in 2016